The Córdoba cinclodes or Comechingones cinclodes (Cinclodes comechingonus) is a species of bird in the family Furnariidae.
It is endemic to Argentina.

It inhabits a narrow strip of land ranging from San Luis to San José de las Salinas.

Its natural habitat is subtropical or tropical high-altitude shrubland.

References

Córdoba cinclodes
Endemic birds of Argentina
Córdoba cinclodes
Taxonomy articles created by Polbot